Amine Ghazoini (born 9 January 2001) is a professional footballer who plays as a right-back for Italian  club Vis Pesaro on loan from Ascoli. Amine Ghazoini was born in Rome, from Moroccan parents.

Club career
On 19 July 2022, Ghazoini was loaned to Vis Pesaro.

Career statistics

Club

Notes

References

2001 births
Living people
Italian people of Moroccan descent
Footballers from Rome
Italian footballers
Italy youth international footballers
Moroccan footballers
Morocco youth international footballers
Association football defenders
Challenger Pro League players
Frosinone Calcio players
Torino F.C. players
Ascoli Calcio 1898 F.C. players
R.E. Virton players
Vis Pesaro dal 1898 players
Italian expatriate footballers
Moroccan expatriate footballers
Italian expatriate sportspeople in Belgium
Moroccan expatriate sportspeople in Belgium
Expatriate footballers in Belgium